The Embassy of the Czech Republic in Ottawa is the Czech Republic's embassy in Canada. It is located at 251 Cooper Street in Ottawa, the Canadian capital. Pavel Hrnčíř serves as Ambassador (as of July 2015).

The Czech Republic operates secondary Canadian consulate offices in Calgary, Montreal, Toronto, Winnipeg and Vancouver.

External links
Embassy of the Czech Republic in Canada
 , Department of Foreign Affairs and International Trade (Canada), July 2007

Czech Republic
Ottawa
Canada–Czechoslovakia relations